The Nordbach is a 1.7 kilometre long, left tributary of the Große Aue in East Westphalian Rödinghausen in the district of Herford in the German state of North Rhine-Westphalia

It discharges into the Große Aue, or Neuer Mühlenbach as it is known in its upper reaches, at a point 82.7 kilometres up the Aue from its mouth.

Swimming pool 

The Nordbach fed the first natural open-air pool in the parish of Rödinghausen. Its basin is used as a fish pond today.

References 

Rivers of North Rhine-Westphalia
Rivers of Germany